John Howard Johnson (born July 5, 1941) is a former professional American football player who played defensive tackle for seven seasons for the Chicago Bears and the New York Giants.

References

External links
 Just Sports Stats

1941 births
Living people
American football defensive tackles
Chicago Bears players
Indiana Hoosiers football players
New York Giants players
Players of American football from Gary, Indiana